A sołectwo  (Polish plural: sołectwa) is an administrative unit in Poland, an optional subdivision of a gmina. The actions and organs of the sołectwo are decided by the gmina council. On 31 December 2018 Poland had 40 740 sołectwa.

Government and politics
A sołectwo council (rada sołecka) provides support to the sołtys. The sołtys and the council are elected by permanent citizens of the sołectwo. A zebranie wiejskie is an example of a direct democracy, as the most important concerns of the citizens are addressed. Citizens' participation in these events varies a lot. The national average is 15%.

From 2010, sołectwa can use their own budget independently if the gmina council agrees to let them to do so. In 2013 half of all gminy with sołectwa adapted to the change.

Structure
A sołectwo usually contains one settlement (village, przysiółek or hamlet), but sometimes it contains more than one or a city has a few sołectwa inside itself.

In cities
The equivalent of a sołectwo in a city is often an osiedle or a dzielnica. There are examples where sołectwa are established within city limits. As of the year 2013, 49 sołectwa were functioning in 12 city gminy. Sołectwa were used as city districts in the cities of Krasnystaw, Orzesze, Jastrzębie-Zdrój, Mikołów, Pieszyce, Zawiercie, Suwałki, Kalisz, Czarna Woda, Miasteczko Śląskie, Woźniki, Sejny and Świnoujście. Until 2013, three sołectwa existed in Warsaw's district of Białołęka.

See also
Wąchock jokes
Settlement geography
Municipality
Schultheiß

References

Subdivisions of Poland